Suffolk Ferry was a train ferry built for the London and North Eastern Railway in 1947. She was subsequently operated by British Railways and Sealink before being withdrawn in 1980 and scrapped in Belgium in 1981.

Description
Suffolk Ferry was built by John Brown & Co, Ltd, Clydebank, Renfrewshire. She was yard number 638. She could carry 35 railway wagons and twelve passengers.

Service
Suffolk Ferry was the first diesel powered ship built for the London and North Eastern Railway. Registered at Harwich, she usually operated on the Harwich – Zeebrugge route, the crossing taking nine hours. Suffolk Ferry entered service in August 1947. With the nationalisation of the railways in the United Kingdom in 1948, ownership of Suffolk Ferry passed to the British Transport Commission.

On 2 January 1956, the Liberian tanker Melody ran aground off Vlissingen, Zeeland, Netherlands. Suffolk Ferry was one of three vessels which went to the assistance of Melody.

On 6 May 1961, Suffolk Ferry rescued all four people from the British yacht Sugar Creek in the North Sea off the Cork Lightship.

On 18 December 1962, Suffolk Ferry reported to Ostend Radio that the Offshore radio ship Uilenspiegel, home of Radio Antwerpen, was adrift and sinking. Suffolk Ferry remained alongside Uilenspiegel until a lifeboat arrived. Uilenspiegel subsequently beached at Cadzand.

In 1963, ownership passed to the British Railways Board. Unkas was later towed in to Rotterdam.

With the introduction of IMO numbers in the late 1960s, Suffolk Ferry was allocated the IMO Number 5343160. Ownership passed to the British Rail subsidiary Sealink in 1979. She was withdrawn from service in September 1980. Suffolk Ferry was towed to Antwerp, Belgium on 25 November 1980. She was scrapped at Burcht, Antwerp in April 1981.

References

1947 ships
Ships built on the River Clyde
Train ferries
Ferries of the United Kingdom
Ships of the London and North Eastern Railway
Ships of British Rail